X logical font description (XLFD) is a font standard used by the X Window System.  Modern X software typically relies on the newer Fontconfig system instead, but XLFDs are still supported in current X window implementations for compatibility with legacy software.

XLFD is intended to support:

 unique, descriptive font names that support simple pattern matching
 multiple font vendors, arbitrary character sets, and encodings
 naming and instancing of scalable and polymorphic fonts
 transformations and subsetting of fonts
 independence of X server and operating or file system implementations
 arbitrarily complex font matching or substitution
 extensibility

One prominent XLFD convention is to refer to individual fonts including any variations using their unique FontName. It comprises a sequence of fourteen hyphen-prefixed, X-registered fields:

FOUNDRY: Type foundry - vendor or supplier of this font
FAMILY_NAME: Typeface family
WEIGHT_NAME: Weight of type
SLANT: Slant (upright, italic, oblique, reverse italic, reverse oblique, or "other")
SETWIDTH_NAME: Proportionate width (e.g. normal, condensed, narrow, expanded/double-wide)
ADD_STYLE_NAME: Additional style (e.g. (Sans) Serif, Informal, Decorated)
PIXEL_SIZE: Size of characters, in pixels; 0 (Zero) means a scalable font
POINT_SIZE: Size of characters, in tenths of points
RESOLUTION_X: Horizontal resolution in dots per inch (DPI), for which the font was designed
RESOLUTION_Y: Vertical resolution, in DPI
SPACING: monospaced, proportional, or "character cell"
AVERAGE_WIDTH: Average width of characters of this font; 0 means scalable font
CHARSET_REGISTRY: Registry defining this character set
CHARSET_ENCODING: Registry's character encoding scheme for this set

The following sample is for a 75-dpi, 12-point, Charter font:

 -bitstream-charter-medium-r-normal--12-120-75-75-p-68-iso8859-1[65 70 80_90]
(which also tells the font source that the client is interested only in characters 65, 70, and 80-90.)

References 

X Window System